German submarine U-610 was a Type VIIC U-boat built for the Nazi Germany's Kriegsmarine for service during World War II. She was laid down on 5 April 1941, launched on 24 December 1941 and commissioned on 19 February 1942. She sunk on 8 October 1943, having sunk 4 ships and damaging another. Her commander was Kapitänleutnant Walter Freiherr von Freyberg-Eisenberg-Allmendingen.

Design
German Type VIIC submarines were preceded by the shorter Type VIIB submarines. U-610 had a displacement of  when at the surface and  while submerged. She had two shafts and two  propellers.

U-610 was fitted with five  torpedo tubes (four fitted at the bow and one at the stern), fourteen torpedoes, one  SK C/35 naval gun, 220 rounds, and a  C/30 anti-aircraft gun. The boat had a complement of between forty-four and sixty.

Service history
U-610 was built by Blohm & Voss, Hamburg as yard number 586. She was ordered on 22 May 1940 and the keel was laid down on 5 April 1941. U-601 was launched on 24 December 1941.

Wolfpacks
U-610 took part in nine wolfpacks, namely:
 Luchs (27 September – 6 October 1942)
 Panther (6 – 20 October 1942)
 Draufgänger (29 November – 11 December 1942)
 Ungestüm (11 – 13 December 1942)
 Raufbold (13 – 18 December 1942)
 Dränger (14 – 20 March 1943)
 Seeteufel (23 – 30 March 1943)
 Meise (11 – 27 April 1943)
 Rossbach (24 September – 8 October 1943)

Fate
On 8 October 1943, while in the North Atlantic Ocean, the U-601 was sunk by a Canadian Sunderland aircraft by depth charges, killing all 51 men on board.

Summary of raiding history

References

Bibliography

External links

World War II submarines of Germany
1941 ships
U-boats commissioned in 1942
Ships built in Hamburg
Ships lost with all hands
U-boats sunk in 1943
U-boats sunk by Canadian aircraft
U-boats sunk by depth charges
World War II shipwrecks in the Atlantic Ocean
German Type VIIC submarines
Maritime incidents in October 1943